Thomas II de Gadagne, known as Thomas the Magnificent (1495, Florence - 1543, Avignon) was an Italian banker active in France.

Life
He inherited a large fortune from his uncle Thomas I de Gadagne as well as solid commercial and financial positions. He increased this fortune, allowing him to lend to major French nobleman and even Francis I of France himself, who made him a counselor and 'maître d'hôtel ordinaire' in his household. In 1537 he founded the  hospital, with its pavillon Saint-Thomas for plague sufferers. He commissioned The Incredulity of Saint Thomas for his uncle's burial chapel.

Thomas II let out the hôtel de Gadagne to the Pierrevive family from 1538. His son Guillaume and Thomas III later became its owners from 1545 to 1581. He married Peronette Berti, with whom he had five children.

Bibliography

References

1495 births
1543 deaths
Italian bankers
French bankers
French people of Italian descent
Businesspeople from Florence
16th-century Italian businesspeople
16th-century French businesspeople